Michael Slade (born 1947, in Lethbridge, Alberta) is the pen name of Canadian novelist Jay Clarke, a lawyer who has participated in more than 100 criminal cases and who specializes in criminal insanity.

Background
Before Clarke entered law school, his undergraduate studies focused on history. Clarke's writing stems from his experience as a practicing lawyer and historian, as well as his extensive world travel. He works closely with police officers to ensure that his novels incorporate state-of-the-art police techniques.

Career
Writing as a team with a handful of other authors, Clarke has published a series of police procedurals about the fictional Special External Section (Special X) of the Royal Canadian Mounted Police. His novels describe Special X protagonists as they track down fugitives, typically deranged murderers. Four other authors have contributed under the name Michael Slade: John Banks, Jay Clarke, Rebecca Clarke, and Richard Covell. Despite the collaborative nature of the books, Jay Clarke is the predominant voice in their writing. Currently, Jay and his daughter Rebecca write under the Slade name.

Slade's novel Ghoul is on the Horror Writers Association's recommended reading list. His work is published by Penguin.

Fans of the series are referred to as Sladists, a play on the word sadist.

Film adaptations
According to a 2008 report on horror movie website Arrow in the Head, Headhunter was optioned for a movie by Brightlight Pictures, set to be written by Wil Zmak and directed by Patrick Lussier. The project appears to have died; as of August 2016, no further details have been released and no information is available from Brightlight's website.

Writing style
Slade writes novels on three concentric levels. At the center of each story is a whodunit or howdunit. Around that is psychological horror, through which Slade ventures into the supernatural without leaving the real world. Police procedure is the outer level.

Special X series
As of 2010, Slade has written fourteen novels in the Special X series.
 Headhunter (1984)
 Ghoul (1987)
 Cutthroat (1992)
 Ripper (1994)
 Zombie (aka. Evil Eye) (1996)
 Shrink (aka. Primal Scream) (1998)
 Burnt Bones (1999)
 Hangman (2000)
 Death's Door (2001)
 Bed of Nails (2003)
 Swastika (2005)
 Kamikaze (2006)
 Crucified (2008)
 Red Snow (2010)

References

External links
SpecialX.net: The Michael Slade website
Interview with Jay and Rebecca Clarke, online at CBC Words at Large (audio)

1947 births
Living people
Canadian male novelists
Canadian crime fiction writers